Bonastre is a Spanish surname. Notable people with the surname include:

Berta Bonastre (born 1992), Spanish field hockey player
Gonzalo Bonastre (born 1981), Spanish footballer
Silvia Bonastre (born 1981), Spanish field hockey player, sister of Berta

Spanish-language surnames